Julia Kolberger (born in Warsaw, Poland in 1978) is a Polish director and actress.

In 2009 she graduated from the Faculty of Directing at National Film School in Łódź).

She is the daughter of Polish actors Krzysztof Kolberger and Anna Romantowska.

References

External links
 
 Profile on Film Polski website 
 Profile on the Film Web website 

1978 births
Living people
Polish actresses
Actresses from Warsaw